The SS Principessa Mafalda was an Italian transatlantic ocean liner built for the Navigazione Generale Italiana (NGI) company. Named after Princess Mafalda of Savoy, second daughter of King Victor Emmanuel III, the ship was completed and entered NGI's South American service between Genoa and Buenos Aires in 1909. Her sister ship  had sunk immediately upon launching on 22 September 1907.

On 25 October 1927, while off the coast of Brazil, a propeller shaft fractured and damaged the hull. The ship sank slowly in the presence of rescue vessels, but confusion and panic resulted in 314 fatalities out of the 1,252 passengers and crew on board the ship. The sinking resulted in the greatest loss of life in Italian shipping and the largest ever in the Southern Hemisphere in peacetime, with the ship that was called "the Italian Titanic".

Early history
The Principessa Mafalda was launched on 22 October 1908 without her superstructure installed in order to avoid the same accident. She was finally completed on 30 March 1909 and became the flagship of the NGI. In 1910 she played a part in the development of long distance radio communication when Guglielmo Marconi conducted experiments on board.

Specifically designed for voyages between Genoa and Buenos Aires, Principessa Mafalda was considered the best ship on this route for several years, travelling at a relatively rapid 18 knots. Her amenities included a two-story ballroom and spacious cabins in Louis XVI style. On the eve of World War I, 22 August 1914, she made her one and only voyage between Genoa and New York City. During the war she was requisitioned by the Italian Royal Navy and housed officers at Taranto. She resumed her prewar South American service in 1918. She remained the NGI's flagship until 1922, when the  assumed the role. By 1926 the Mafalda had made over 90 long but uneventful round trips.

On 10 January 1920, the ship was reported missing due to hitting a mine with a full loss of life.  Two days later, it sent a radio signal that it was safe and was proceeding as normal.

Last voyage and sinking

On 11 October 1927 Principessa Mafalda sailed from Genoa for Buenos Aires with intermediate stops scheduled at Barcelona, Dakar, Rio de Janeiro, Santos and Montevideo. The ship was under the command of Captain Simone Gulì with 971 passengers and 281 crew aboard. She also carried 300 tonnes of cargo, 600 bags of mail, and 250,000 gold lire destined for the Argentine government. The trip was to take 14 days.

It soon became apparent that the ship was in poor condition. Principessa Mafalda left Barcelona almost a day late due to mechanical problems and several times she slowed to a complete stop on the high seas, sometimes for hours. Water in bathrooms became intermittent. A refrigeration system failure caused tons of food to spoil, resulting in numerous cases of food poisoning. At the stop at Cape Verde, Captain Gulì telegraphed the company to request a replacement vessel, but was told "Continue to Rio and await instructions." With the ship resupplied with fresh food and partially repaired, he took her out onto the Atlantic.

By 23 October Principessa Mafalda had developed a small but noticeable list to port. The passengers, who had received few explanations for the previous breakdowns, now began to worry that the ship was taking on water. Although far behind schedule, she was finally traveling at full steam off the coast of northern Brazil on the 24th. Life aboard then flowed more quietly with the longest part of the journey nearly complete. On crossing the Equator, a line-crossing ceremony was organized on deck with orchestra music and a huge cake.

Around 17:15 hours on 25 October 1927, near the Abrolhos Archipelago, 80 miles off Salvador de Bahia, Brazil, the ship was rocked by several strong shudders. Passengers were initially assured that this was only due to the loss of a propeller and the situation was not dangerous. However, on the bridge the engineer reported that the starboard propeller shaft had indeed fractured, but it had also traveled off its axis and cut a series of gashes in the hull. Complicating matters, the watertight doors could not be fully closed. At 17:35 Captain Gulì sounded the alarm and ordered the radio officer to send SOS. He also stated this was merely a precaution as he believed his ship could stay afloat until the next day. With clear weather and rescue nearby, it seemed that the situation was in hand. However, panic began to spread among both passengers and crew.

There are many conflicting versions about what happened next. What is known is that officers had difficulty maintaining order, some passengers were armed, and the ship kept moving forward in a wide circle for at least an hour. Rescue vessels received confusing signals about how to assist. Not all the lifeboats could be launched due to the list, some were rushed by the crowd, and many were not even seaworthy. An Argentinian newspaper claimed that the first lifeboat away was filled almost entirely with crew, including the purser. The rescue vessels, fearing a possible boiler explosion, kept themselves at a distance. A few remaining lifeboats did shuttle between Principessa Mafalda and Alhena, but some were capsized by the panicked throngs. Captain Gulì went down with the ship, and the chief engineer, Silvio Scarabicchi, reportedly committed suicide by shooting himself. Gulì was posthumously decorated for bravery at sea, as were the two radio operators, Luigi Reschia and Francesco Boldracchi, who had remained at their post until they drowned.

At 22:10, nearly five hours after the initial accident, Principessa Mafalda sank stern first. Since she went down on a busy shipping lane, a number of vessels arrived to assist. By daybreak, Alhena had picked up 450 survivors.  rescued 300, Empire Star rescued 202,  151.  rescued 122.  rescued 49 people, 22 of whom were landed at Bahia. Those rescued by Empire Star were transferred to Formosa and landed at Rio de Janeiro. Many controversies remain about exactly what transpired and who was responsible for the death toll. Reports of gunfire, sharks in the water, exploding boilers, and nearby ships refusing to assist were widely published but never confirmed. Even the exact wreck site remains a matter of dispute today. At the time, the sinking was the largest loss of life on an Italian ship and in the Southern Hemisphere.

Aftermath
An investigation by the Italian Navy Board began immediately following the tragedy. It determined that a joint in the propeller casing was to blame for the accident and it ordered that propeller shafts on all Italian-registered vessels be fitted with devices designed to avoid such accidents. It also determined that six lifeboats located on the stern could not be used because of poor placement. Issues of the vessel's age, inadequate maintenance, and the problematic actions of the crew were not investigated. However, the NGI was ordered to pay heavy compensation to the families of victims.

A 2012 analysis discovered that while the number of casualties among steerage passengers was indeed high, more first-class passengers died (51.8%) than did steerage class passengers (27.8%).

Citations

References

External links

1908 ships
Ships built in Italy
Ocean liners
Passenger ships of Italy
Merchant ships of Italy
World War I passenger ships of Italy
World War I merchant ships of Italy
World War I naval ships of Italy
Maritime incidents in 1927
Maritime incidents in Brazil